Government General Degree College, Kalna  (also known as Kalna Government College), established in 2015, is the government general degree college in Purba Bardhaman district. It offers undergraduate courses in science and arts. It is affiliated to University of Burdwan.

Departments

Science

Physics
Chemistry
Mathematics

Arts and Commerce

Bengali
English
History
Sanskrit
Education
Commerce

See also

References

External links
Government General Degree College, Kalna

Universities and colleges in Purba Bardhaman district
Colleges affiliated to University of Burdwan
Educational institutions established in 2015
2015 establishments in West Bengal
Government colleges in West Bengal